is a brand name of canned and plastic bottled coffee and coffee-flavored beverages sold by Suntory in Japan.

History 
Boss was first released in 1992 and is one of many brands of Japanese canned coffee. The logo for the brand features author William Faulkner smoking a pipe. Since 2006, American actor Tommy Lee Jones has appeared in a series of TV commercials and billboards for the brand, becoming one of the most recognised faces in Japan. 

The Suntory Boss brand was launched in Australia, New Zealand, and the U.S. in 2019, with two products. In the Australian and New Zealand product lines, the depiction of Faulkner in the logo does not include his pipe.

References

External links 

 

Japanese drinks
Coffee softdrinks
Coffee brands
Products introduced in 1992
Suntory